The 2007 Harvard Crimson football team represented Harvard University in the 2007 NCAA Division I FCS football season. Under 14th-year head coach Tim Murphy, the Crimson compiled an 8–2 record and went undefeated in Ivy League play, winning the conference championship. Harvard averaged 12,423 fans per game.

The team was ranked 21 in the Final poll standings for the FCS football season.

Harvard played its home games at Harvard Stadium in the Allston neighborhood of Boston, Massachusetts.

Schedule

References

Harvard
Harvard Crimson football seasons
Ivy League football champion seasons
Harvard Crimson football
Harvard Crimson football